Mezen may refer to:

Places
Mezen (river), a river in the Komi Republic and Arkhangelsk Oblast, Russia
Mezen Bay, a bay of the White Sea in Russia
Mezen (inhabited locality), several inhabited localities in Russia
Mezen Airport, an airport in Arkhangelsk Oblast, Russia
Mezen Basin, a sedimentary basin in northern European Russia

People

See also
Mézens, a commune in the Tarn Department in France
Mezensky (disambiguation)